Nejdek is a town in Karlovy Vary District in the Karlovy Vary Region, Czech Republic. It has about 7,600 inhabitants.

Administrative parts

Villages of Bernov, Fojtov, Lesík, Lužec, Oldřichov, Pozorka, Suchá, Tisová and Vysoká Štola are administrative parts of Nejdek.

Etymology
The name originated from German neue Decke, i.e. "new cover". It was derived from the newly covered roof of the castle tower.

Geography
It lies on the Rolava river, in the west of the Ore Mountains.

History
Nejdek was founded around 1250 as a tin mining settlement. The first written mention of Nejdek is from 1340. During the golden era of tin mining in the 14th–16th century, the town experienced its greatest expansion. From 1446 to 1602, it was owned by the Schlick family. During their rule, iron ore also began to be mined, and smelters and hammer mills were established in the area.

In 1602–1633, the Nejdek estate was owned by the Collon family, and violent re-Catholicization took place. During this period, many inhabitants left and there was a decline in mining.

In the 19th century, the town was industrialized. Ironworks and spinning mill were established. In 1899, the Karlovy Vary–Johanngeorgenstadt railway was put into operation.

Demographics

Sights

The Romanesque-Gothic tower is the most important monument in Nejdek. It is a remnant of a castle, which was built around 1250 to protect a trade route. It was inhabited until 1790. Today the tower serves as a bell tower and contains a rare Renaissance bell.

The Church of Saint Martin was first mentioned in 1354. The small Gothic church was rebuilt and extended several times, it current appearance with Rococo equipment is from 1755–1756.

Nejdek Château was built approximately in 1650–1653. It was originally a two-storey castle, it was destroyed by fire in 1857 and completely rebuilt in the pseudo-Baroque style with pseudo-Renaissance and pseudo-Gothic elements.

Nejdek Stations of the Cross was built in 1851–1858 and leads to the top of the hill Křížový vrch.

Pajndl is an observation tower located on Tisovský vrch. It is a -high stone tower that dates from 1897. It is a cultural monument.

Notable people
Ignatius Sichelbart (1708–1780), German Jesuit missionary
Wenceslaus Linck (1736–1797), German Jesuit missionary
Vladimír Ráž (1923–2000), actor
Ewald Körner (1926–2010), German clarinetist and conductor

Twin towns – sister cities

Nejdek is twinned with:
 Johanngeorgenstadt, Germany

References

External links

Cities and towns in the Czech Republic
Populated places in Karlovy Vary District
Towns in the Ore Mountains